The bibliography of Yellowstone National Park identifies English language historic, scientific, ecological, cultural, tourism, social, and advocacy books, journals and studies on the subject of Yellowstone National Park topics published since 1870 and documented in Yellowstone related bibliographies and other related references.

Ecology
The following references are primarily focused on the ecology of the park.

Fauna
The following references are primarily focused on the history, taxonomy and management of the park's animal wildlife.

Fisheries
The following references are primarily focused on the history, taxonomy and management of, and angling in the park's fisheries:
 
 
 
 
 
 
 ,

Flora
The following references are primarily focused on the history, taxonomy and management of the park's flora.

Geology and geothermal features

The following references are primarily focused on the geology and geothermal features within the park.

History
The following references are primarily focused on the exploration, creation and history of the park.
 
 
 
 

 
 

 
 ,
 Farrell, Justin. The Battle for Yellowstone: Morality and the Sacred Roots of Environmental Conflict (Princeton University Press, 2015).

Management
The following references are primarily focused on issues of park management by the U.S. Army and the National Park Service.

Native Americans in Yellowstone National Park

The following references are primarily focused on the history of Native Americans within the park.

Online bibliographies

Sociology

Tourism and recreation

The following references are primarily related to promoting tourism and recreational opportunities in the park, to include memoirs and recollections of prominent tourist experiences.
 
 
 
 

 
 
  
 The Haynes Guide was published annually and continually until 1966, first by F. Jay Haynes and then by his son Jack Ellis Haynes

References

Yellowstone National Park
Yellowstone National Park
 Yellowstone
 Yellowstone
 Yellowstone